The 1925–26 Landsfodboldturneringen was the 13th edition of the Danish national football championship play-offs, a Danish FA-organised club football tournament between the championship clubs from each of the six regional football associations. In advance of the tournament, a play-off structure had been agreed, which meant that the winners of KBUs Mesterskabsrække were directly qualified for the national championship final against the winner of the Provincial championship tournament.

Province tournament

First round
IK Viking Rønne 1-2 Skovshoved IF (aet)

Second round
Skovshoved IF 0-5 Boldklubben 1901
Svendborg Boldklub 1-3 Horsens fS

Third round
Boldklubben 1901 7-3 Horsens fS

Copenhagen Championship

Final
Boldklubben 1903 4-4 Boldklubben 1901

Replay 1
Boldklubben 1903 3-3 Boldklubben 1901

Replay 2
Boldklubben 1903 7-2 Boldklubben 1901

References
Denmark - List of final tables (RSSSF)

Top level Danish football league seasons
1925–26 in Danish football
Denmark